Lieutenant-Colonel William Ewart Fairbairn (28 February 1885 – 20 June 1960) was a British Royal Marine and police officer. He developed hand-to-hand combat methods for the Shanghai Police during the interwar period, as well as for the allied special forces during World War II. He created his own fighting system known as Defendu. Notably, this included innovative pistol shooting techniques and the development of the Fairbairn–Sykes fighting knife.

The television series Secrets of War suggested him as a possible inspiration for Q Branch in the James Bond series.

Military career
Fairbairn served with the Royal Marine Light Infantry starting in 1901, and joined the Shanghai Municipal Police (SMP) in 1907. He served in one of the red light districts. During his service with the International Police in Shanghai, Fairbairn reportedly engaged in hundreds of street fights in the course of his duties over a twenty-year career, where he organised and headed a special anti-riot squad. Much of his body, arms, legs, torso, even the palms of his hands, were covered with scars from knife wounds from those fights.  Fairbairn later created, organised, and trained a special anti-riot squad for the Shanghai police force. He also developed numerous firearms training courses and items of police equipment, including a special metal-lined bulletproof vest designed to stop high-velocity bullets from the 7.63x25mm Mauser pistol.

During World War II, he was recruited by the British Special Operations Executive as an Army officer, where he was given the nickname "Dangerous Dan". Together with fellow close-combat instructor Eric Sykes, Fairbairn was commissioned on the General List in 1941. Fairbairn and Sykes were both commissioned as second lieutenants on 15 July 1940. He trained British, American and Canadian Commandos and No. 2 Dutch Troop 10th Inter-Allied Commando forces, along with Ranger candidates in close-combat, pistol-shooting and knife-fighting techniques. Fairbairn emphasised the necessity of forgetting any idea of gentlemanly conduct or fighting fair: "Get tough, get down in the gutter, win at all costs... I teach what is called 'Gutter Fighting.' There's no fair play, no rules except one: kill or be killed," he declared. One of his pupils was Raymond Westerling, who fought behind enemy lines in Burma and Indonesia.

In 1941, he appeared in a training film titled "Unarmed Combat", demonstrating many of the strikes, holds and throws of Defendu, for use by the Home Guard, Commandos, and military services. This training film was narrated by actor David Niven, who had joined the Commandos early in the war, and was trained by Fairbairn himself. In 1942, Fairbairn appeared, again uncredited, in an OSS training film titled "OSS Training Center", directed by John Ford. Fairbairn again demonstrated unarmed combat, and also his version of "Point Shooting", later adopted and refined by Rex Applegate for use by the U.S. Army.

For his achievements in training OSS personnel, Fairbairn eventually rose to the rank of Lieutenant-Colonel by the end of the war, and received the U.S. Legion of Merit (Officer grade) at the specific request of OSS-founder "Wild Bill" Donovan.

Martial arts
After joining the SMP, he studied boxing, wrestling, savate, Shin no Shinto ryu jujutsu (Yoshin ryu) from Okada-sensei, Kodokan judo in which he gained a 2nd dan black belt, and then Chinese martial arts. He developed his own fighting system—Defendu—and taught it to members of that police force in order to reduce officer fatalities. He described this system as primarily based on his personal experience, which according to police records included some 600 non-training fights, by his retirement at age 55 from the position of Assistant Commissioner in 1940.

In 1951, he went to Cyprus to train police and in 1952 (and 1956) Fairbairn provided training to the Singapore Police Force's Riot Squad unit, which is now Police Tactical Unit.

Weapons innovations
Together with Eric A. Sykes, Fairbairn developed innovative pistol shooting techniques and handgun specifications for the SMP which were later disseminated through their book Shooting to Live With the One-Hand Gun (1942), along with various other police innovations such as riot batons, armoured vests, and other equipment.

He is perhaps best known for designing the famous Fairbairn–Sykes fighting knife, or 'Commando' knife, a stilletto-style fighting dagger used by British Special Forces in the Second World War, and featured in his textbook Scientific Self-Defence.  Fairbairn also designed the lesser known Smatchet, and collaborated on the design of several other combat knife designs.

Publications

  Defendu, first published in 1926 in Shanghai by the North China Daily News & Herald Ltd.  Size 7" X 10", hardcover, cloth bound with 171 pages. Reprinted by Naval and Military Press 
  Scientific Self-Defence, first published in 1931 by D. Appleton and Company (New York & London).  Size 6 ½" X 9 ½", in hardcover with 165 pages. A slightly modified/updated version of Defendu. Reprinted by Naval and Military Press 
  All-In Fighting, first published in 1942 by Faber and Faber Limited (London).  Size 5 ½" X 8 ¼" in hardcover with 132 pages. Reprinted by Naval and Military Press 
  Get Tough, first published in 1942 by D. Appleton-Century Company (New York & London).  Size 5 ½" X 7 ¾" in softcover with 121 pages. This is a modified version of All-In Fighting for the American market. Note the first edition has Fairbairn's rank as 'Captain' all subsequent (1940's) editions as 'Major'. Reprinted by Naval and Military Press 
  Self Defence for Women and Girls, first published in 1942 by Faber and Faber (London).  Size 5 ½" X 8" softcover with 48 pages.
  Hands Off!: Self-Defense for Women, first published in 1942 by D. Appleton-Century Company (New York & London). Size 5 ¼" X 8" in softcover with 41 pages. This is a modified version of Self Defence for Women and Girls for the American market. Reprinted by Naval and Military Press 
  Shooting to Live, co-authored by Eric Anthony Sykes, first published in 1942 by Oliver and Boyd (London). Size 4 ¾" X 7" in hardcover with 96 pages.  (reprint). Reprinted by Naval and Military Press 
 WE Fairbairn's Complete Compendium of Lethal, Unarmed, Hand-to-Hand Combat Methods and Fighting. All six of WE Fairbairn's works in one binding to create the ultimate compendium: Get Tough, All-In Fighting, Shooting to Live, Scientific Self-Defence, Hands Off!, Defendu. Naval and Military Press 2020

See also
Close combat
Combatives
Camp X
Applegate-Fairbairn fighting knife
All-In Fighting

References

Sources
 Giles Milton The Ministry of Ungentlemanly Warfare, 2016, John Murray. 
The Legend of W. E. Fairbairn, Gentleman and Warrior: The Shanghai Years by Peter Robins, edited by Paul Child. 2005. . First biography on Fairbairn.
The First Commando Knives by Kelly Yeaton, Samuel S. Yeaton, and Rex Applegate. Phillips Publications, 1996. 
Empire Made Me: An Englishman Adrift in Shanghai by Robert Bickers. 2003. , . Life and times of a member of the Shanghai Municipal Police.
Contemporary Knife Targeting - Modern Science vs. W. E. Fairbairn's Timetable of Death by Christopher Grosz and Michael D. Janich - a thorough analysis of Fairbairn's work on human anatomy and knife fighting.
The Shanghai Fighting Knives, and many fakes!!!! (2010) by O. Janson. Summary of the Shanghai Fighting Knife and its evolution into the Fairbairn–Sykes fighting knife.

External links
Training Film "Unarmed Combat" 1941 with appearance by Fairbairn himself (at YouTube)
Film archives about close-combat with lessons by Major Fairbairn himself (at YouTube)
The Source by Peter Robins (American Combatives)
Shanghai Municipal Police by Robert Bickers
Get Tough!, a book on close-quarters fighting written by Fairbairn
Badass of the Week: William E. Fairbairn

1885 births
1960 deaths
British colonial police officers
British Army General List officers
Royal Marines ranks
English male judoka
British Army personnel of World War II
Officers of the Legion of Merit
Martial arts school founders
Office of Strategic Services
20th-century philanthropists
British expatriates in China